André Caplet (23 November 1878 – 22 April 1925) was a French composer and conductor of classical music. He was a friend of Claude Debussy and completed the orchestration of several of Debussy's compositions as well as arrangements of several of them for different instruments.

Early life
André Caplet was born in Le Havre on 23 November 1878, the youngest of seven children born to a Norman family of modest means. He began studying piano and violin when a child and by the age of 13 performed in the orchestra of the Grand Théâtre there. He entered the Paris Conservatory in 1896 and won several prizes. While a student he supported himself first by playing in dance orchestras in the evening and then by conducting, where had immediate success. After a stint as assistant conductor of the Orchestre Colonne, in 1899 he took over the musical direction at the Théâtre de l'Odéon. Some of his student compositions were published as early as 1897. The Société des compositeurs de musique (SCM), the less avant-garde of French organizations promoting new music, awarded his quintet for piano and winds first prize in 1901 and premiered it on 28 February of that year. Caplet soon had success with the more progressive Société nationale de musique (SCM) as well, including a concert dedicated to his work on 9 March 1901, and he was hailed in the musical press and from these performances until the end of his career his chamber works had a champion in the flutist Georges Barrère.

He won the Prix de Rome in 1901, composing in a conventional style to please the judges, while Maurice Ravel showed his contempt for the assigned text. Caplet's native city celebrated his participation with a performance of his Été for chorus and orchestra (1899) on 3 April 1901 and marked his victory by presenting several of his works at a concert on 24 November, including L'Été, Pâques citadines for chorus and orchestra, Feuillets d'album for flute and piano (1901), and the cantata that won him the Prix de Rome, Myrra (1901). 

Until the end of 1905, Caplet lived at the French Academy in Rome with the financial support the prize provided, though he took leave for long periods to attend performances in Berlin, Dresden, Hamburg.

Pre-war career
As a composer Caplet wrote many vocal works and chamber pieces, several works for orchestra and only a handful of piano pieces. Especially interesting is his instrumental use of voices, as in his Septuor à cordes vocales et instrumentales (1909). He was also one the composers who first incorporated the saxophone into his chamber works, like Légende (1903) and Impressions d’automne (1905).

Caplet served as one of the conductors of the Boston Opera Company for four seasons, from 1910 to 1914, specializing in the French repertoire. He secured the appointment through one of its co-founders, the impresario Henry Russell, whose wife Nina became a friend of Caplet during his time in Rome. He accepted the position to enhance his reputation as a conductor and used it to introduce contemporary French repertoire to the United States. Works by Debussy that he led include L'enfant prodigue, the Children's Corner, Pelléas et Mélisande, and the incidental music to Le Martyre de saint Sébastien.

World War I
At the end of 1914, after he had completed two movements of a work that became Les Prières, Caplet enlisted in the French army and saw combat in the trenches at Verdun. He was wounded in May 1915 and later promoted to sergeant. In 1917 he completed the third movement and the work premiered that same year in the small church of Ham, Picardy, accompanied by the distant sounds of artillery. His service ended in 1919. On 4 June of that year he married Geneviève Perruchon, a general's daughter who followed his work as a composer closely. They had a son in 1920.

In 1918–19, he taught conducting, harmony, and orchestration at the music school established by Walter Damrosch at the behest of U.S. General John J. Pershing in Chaumont to train U.S. military personnel in hopes of creating military bands on the model of those found in France.

Post-war years
Caplet did not return to teaching and conducting at the war's end. Instead he devoted himself to composition, including a number of religious works. His Messe à trois voix for a capella female chorus had its premiere in Sainte Chapelle on 13 June 1922. It lacks the traditional "Credo" and includes the familiar Communion motet "O salutaris hostia".

His oratorio-like Le Miroir de Jésus composed in September 1923 features a "choeur de femmes" in an supporting role. In Miroir Caplet set texts by Henri Ghéon as meditations on the fifteen decades of the rosary. The chorus announces each section's title but the female soloist delivers most of the text. The music of the central movements that take Christ's passion as their subject are, according to one commentator, "remarkable for its restraint as for its dissonance". It was a religious concert work of a sort not encountered again until Olivier Messiaen's Trois petites liturgies (1944). The British music critic Felix Aprahamian wrote that the musical textures of this work "reflect at once the polychrome tones and timbres of Debussy's art and the fourths, fifths, discant and parallel motion of the ars antiqua". Caplet conducted its premiere in February 1924 in Lyon and its Paris premiere on 1 May of that year.

Work with Debussy

He became a close friend of Claude Debussy, sometimes serving as translator, and he orchestrated part of Debussy's Le Martyre de saint Sébastien. He also collaborated with Debussy in the orchestration of La boîte à joujoux. In 1911, Caplet prepared an orchestration of Debussy's Children's Corner, which, along with his orchestration of Clair de lune from the Suite bergamasque is probably the most widely performed and recorded example of his work.

Death
In 1925, Caplet caught a cold and, given how his lungs had been weakened when he was gassed during his military service, developed pleurisy, which proved fatal. He died in Neuilly-sur-Seine (Hauts-de-Seine), a suburb of Paris, on 22 April 1925 at the age of 46. He was buried in Montmartre Cemetery.

His widow conducted many concerts of his music.

In 1926, the sculptor Jacques Zwobada, a native of Neuilly, was commissioned to create a monument to Caplet. This was one of Zwobada's earliest works after he graduated from the École des Beaux-Arts.

Works

For voice
Voice and piano
Viens! ... Une flûte invisible, (Hugo), August 1900
Myrrha, (text by Fernand Beissier)
Green, (Verlaine), 1902
Il était une fois, (Richepin), January 1903
Poème de mai (Tu nous souriais), (A. Silvestre), 1902
Dans la fontaine, (P. Gravollet), 1903
Papillons, (P. Gravollet), February 1903
Le Livre rose, (P.J. Pain), 1898–1901
1. Le livre ou je veux lire
2. Premier prix
3. Les pleurs de bébé
4. Le furet du bois, mesdames
Chanson d'automne, (A. Silvestre), 1900
Paroles à l'absente, G. Jean-Aubry, 1908
1. Préludes
2. Ce sable fin et fuyant
3. Angoise
Les Prières, 1914–1917, (also for harp and string quartet)
1. Oraison dominicale
2. Salutation angélique
3. Symbole des apôtres
Le vieux coffret, (R. de Gourmont), 1914–1917
1. Songe
2. Berceuse
3. In una selva oscura
4. Forêt
En regardant ces belles fleurs, (C. d'Orleans), October 1914
Nuit d'automne, (H. de Regnier), 9 March 1915
Prière normande, (J. Hebertot), 1916
Solitude, (J. Ochse), 1915
Quand reverrai-je, hélas!..., (J. du Bellay), 27 August 1916, (published by Lyra with harp accompaniment)
La croix douloureuse, (R.P. Lacordaire), for the armed forces
Détresse!..., (H. Charasson), 9 November 1918
Trois Fables, (La Fontaine), 1919
1. Le corbeau et le renard
2. La cigale et la fourmi
3. Le loup et l'agneau
Le Pain quotidien, (15 exercises), 1920
Cinq Ballades françaises, (P. Fort) 1920
1.) Cloche d'aube
2. La ronde
3. Notre chaumière en Yveline
4. Songe d'une nuit d'été
5. L'adieu en barque
L'hymne à la naissance du matin, (reduction, P. Fort), November 1920
La cloche felée, (C. Baudelaire), January 1922
La mort des pauvres, (C. Baudelaire), June 1922
Le miroir de Jésus, (reduction) (H. Gheon), Summer 1923
La part à Dieu, (chanson populaire), 1925

Voice and organ
Pie Jesu, March 1919
Panis angelicus, 21 June 1919
Pater noster, November 1919
Tu es sacerdos, 27 July 1920
Les prières, 1914-1917

Voice and flute
Corbeille de fruits, (R. Tagore), September 1924
Écoute mon coeur, 19 September 1924

Voice and harp
Sonnet: "Doux fut le trait", (Ronsard), 8 April 1924, published by Lyra with Quand reverrai-je ... 

Voice and orchestra
Myrrha, scène lyrique, (1er Grand Prix de Rome), (F. Beissier), 1901
Il était une fois, (J. Richepin)
Paroles a l'absente, (G. Jean-Aubry), 1908
1. Préludes
2. Angoisse
Le vieux Coffret, (R. de Gourmont)
La croix douloureuse, (R.P. LaCordaire)
Détresse!..., (H. Carasson)
Hymne à la naissance du matin, (P. Fort), November 1920
Les prières (voice, harp, string quartet) (see under voice and piano)

A cappella chorus
Messe à trois voix, 1919-1920 
1. Kyrie eleison
2. Gloria
3. Sanctus
4. Agnus Dei
5. O Salutaris
Inscriptions champêtres, (R. de Gourmont), August 1914

Mixed chorus and orchestra
Été, (V. Hugo), 1899
Paques citadines, (C. Spinelli), 1900 (published 1920)

Orchestral works
Suite d'orchestre (sur des mélodies populaires persanes), 1900
Légende (suite symphonique pour harpe chromatique, alto saxophone et instruments à cordes), 1905 (precursor to Conte Fantastique)
Étude symphonique 
Le masque de la mort rouge pour harpe chromatique principale, 1908
Marche solennelle pour le centenaire de la Villa Medicis, 1903
Salammbô, (poème symphonique) 1902
Marche heroïque de la Ve Division, pour musique militaire, 1917
Epiphanie, fresque musicale pour violoncelle principal et orchestre, 1923

Chamber music
Small ensembles
Quintette pour piano, flûte, hautbois, clarinette et basson, 1898
1. Allegro
2. Adagio
3. Scherzo
4. Finale
Suite persane for double quintet (2 flûtes, 2 hautbois, 2 clarinettes, 2 bassons, and 2 cors), 1900, original version, also for orchestra
1. Scharki, (allegretto) 
2. Nihavend, (andantino)
3. Iskia Samaisi, (vivo)
Septuor, pour quatour a cordes et 3 voix feminines, 1909
Sonate pour piano, voix, violoncelle, 1919
Conte fantastique or The Masque of the Red Death d'après Poe pour harpe à pedales et quatour à cordes, (published 1924)
Le miroir de Jésus pour voix principale, 3 voix accompagnantes, quatour a cordes et harpe, (original version: Été), 1923
Sonata da chiesa pour violon et orgue, 1924
1. Quiet
2. Interieur
3. Alleluia
Impressions d’automne – Elégie pour alto saxophone, hautbois, 2 clarinettes, basson, harpe, orgue et 2 violoncelles, 1905

Cello and piano
Élegie, 1903
Allegresse, 1903
Épiphanie
Improvisations

Flute and piano
Rêverie et Petite valse, 1897
dedicated to Barrère and incorporated as Nos. 2 and 5 in Feuillets d'album
Feuillets d'album, 1901
Viens! Une flûte invisible, 1900, voice, flute, piano

Piano, two hands
Menuet dans le style ancien, 1897
Deux pièces, 1900

Piano, four hands
Prelude, 1899
Do, Re, Mi, Fa, Sol (petites pièces faciles), 1901
Un tas de petites choses, 1919

Harp solo
Deux Divertissements (1. à la française, 2. à l'espagnole'), 1924, published 1925, Durand

Arrangements of works by Debussy
For various numbers of pianos and players
Images
1. Rondes de Printemps
2. Gigues
3. Ibéria
La Mer
Le martyre de Saint Sébastien, voix et piano 
La mer, 2 pianos, 6 hands

For orchestra 
Children's Corner (1911)
Pagodes
Clair de lune from Suite bergamasque
Le martyre de Saint Sébastien, Fragments symphoniques (1911)

Other arrangements
 Chabrier's Danse villageoise for seven winds

Notes

References

Additional sources

External links
Le martyre de Saint-Sébastien: mystère en cinq actes, music by Debussy, transcribed by Caplet Score from Sibley Music Library Digital Scores Collection
The Masque of Red Death Score from Sibley Music Library Digital Scores Collection
André-Caplet.fr 

1878 births
1925 deaths
19th-century classical composers
20th-century classical composers
French classical composers
French male classical composers
Musicians  from Le Havre
Prix de Rome for composition
19th-century French composers
20th-century French composers
20th-century French male musicians
19th-century French male musicians